Santo Estêvão is a former civil parish, located in the municipality of Alenquer, in western Portugal. In 2013, the parish merged into the new parish Alenquer (Santo Estêvão e Triana). It covers 16.09 km² in area, with 5338 inhabitants as of 2001.

References

Former parishes of Alenquer, Portugal